An approximation is anything that is intentionally similar but not exactly equal to something else.

Etymology and usage
The word approximation is derived from Latin approximatus, from proximus meaning very near and the prefix ad- (ad- before p becomes ap- by assimilation) meaning to. Words like approximate, approximately and approximation are used especially in technical or scientific contexts. In everyday English, words such as roughly or around are used with a similar meaning. It is often found abbreviated as approx.

The term can be applied to various properties (e.g., value, quantity, image, description) that are nearly, but not exactly correct; similar, but not exactly the same (e.g., the approximate time was 10 o'clock).
 
Although approximation is most often applied to numbers, it is also frequently applied to such things as mathematical functions, shapes, and physical laws.

In science, approximation can refer to using a simpler process or model when the correct model is difficult to use. An approximate model is used to make calculations easier. Approximations might also be used if incomplete information prevents use of exact representations.

The type of approximation used depends on the available information, the degree of accuracy required, the sensitivity of the problem to this data, and the savings (usually in time and effort) that can be achieved by approximation.

Mathematics 
Approximation theory is a branch of mathematics, a quantitative part of functional analysis. Diophantine approximation deals with approximations of real numbers by rational numbers.

Approximation usually occurs when an exact form  or an exact numerical number is unknown or difficult to obtain. However some known form may exist and may be able to represent the real form so that no significant deviation can be found. For example, 1.5 × 106 means that the approximation 1,500,000 has been measured to the nearest hundred thousand (the actual value is somewhere between 1,450,000 and 1,550,000), this is in contrast to the notation 1.500 × 106 which measures 1,500,000 to the nearest thousand (therefore giving a true value somewhere between 1,499,500 and 1,500,500).

Numerical approximations sometimes result from using a small number of significant digits. Calculations are likely to involve rounding errors and other approximation errors. Log tables, slide rules and calculators produce approximate answers to all but the simplest calculations. The results of computer calculations are normally an approximation expressed in a limited number of significant digits, although they can be programmed to produce more precise results. Approximation can occur when a decimal number cannot be expressed in a finite number of binary digits.

Related to approximation of functions is the asymptotic value of a function, i.e. the value as one or more of a function's parameters becomes arbitrarily large. For example, the sum  (k/2)+(k/4)+(k/8)+...(k/2^n) is asymptotically equal to k. No consistent notation is used throughout mathematics and some texts use ≈ to mean approximately equal and ~ to mean asymptotically equal whereas other texts use the symbols the other way around.

Typography

The approximately equals sign, ≈, was introduced by British mathematician Alfred Greenhill.

LaTeX symbols
Symbols used in LaTeX markup.
  (\approx), usually to indicate approximation between numbers, like .
  (\not\approx), usually to indicate that numbers are not approximately equal (1  2).
  (\simeq), usually to indicate asymptotic equivalence between functions, like . So writing  would be wrong under this definition, despite wide use.
  (\sim), usually to indicate proportionality between functions, the same   of the line above will be .
  (\cong), usually to indicate congruence between figures, like .
  (\eqsim), usually to indicate that two quantities are equal up to constants.

Unicode

Symbols used to denote items that are approximately equal are wavy or dotted equals signs.
 : which is also sometimes used to indicate proportionality
 : which is also sometimes used to indicate proportionality
 : another combination of "≈" and "=", which is used to indicate isomorphism or congruence
 
 
 
 
 : yet another combination of "≈" and "=", used to indicate equivalence or approximate equivalence
 : which can be used to represent the approach of a variable, to a limit; like the common syntax,  ≐ 0 
 : which is used like "≈" or "≃" in Japan, Taiwan, and Korea
 : a reversed variation of

Science 
Approximation arises naturally in scientific experiments. The predictions of a scientific theory can differ from actual measurements. This can be because there are factors in the real situation that are not included in the theory. For example, simple calculations may not include the effect of air resistance. Under these circumstances, the theory is an approximation to reality. Differences may also arise because of limitations in the measuring technique. In this case, the measurement is an approximation to the actual value.

The history of science shows that earlier theories and laws can be approximations to some deeper set of laws. Under the correspondence principle, a new scientific theory should reproduce the results of older, well-established, theories in those domains where the old theories work. The old theory becomes an approximation to the new theory.

Some problems in physics are too complex to solve by direct analysis, or progress could be limited by available analytical tools. Thus, even when the exact representation is known, an approximation may yield a sufficiently accurate solution while reducing the complexity of the problem significantly. Physicists often approximate the shape of the Earth as a sphere even though more accurate representations are possible, because many physical characteristics (e.g., gravity) are much easier to calculate for a sphere than for other shapes.

Approximation is also used to analyze the motion of several planets orbiting a star. This is extremely difficult due to the complex interactions of the planets' gravitational effects on each other. An approximate solution is effected by performing iterations. In the first iteration, the planets' gravitational interactions are ignored, and the star is assumed to be fixed. If a more precise solution is desired, another iteration is then performed, using the positions and motions of the planets as identified in the first iteration, but adding a first-order gravity interaction from each planet on the others. This process may be repeated until a satisfactorily precise solution is obtained.

The use of perturbations to correct for the errors can yield more accurate solutions. Simulations of the motions of the planets and the star also yields more accurate solutions.

The most common versions of philosophy of science accept that empirical measurements are always approximations — they do not perfectly represent what is being measured.

Law
Within the European Union (EU), "approximation" refers to a process through which EU legislation is implemented and incorporated within Member States' national laws, despite variations in the existing legal framework in each country. Approximation is required as part of the pre-accession process for new member states, and as a continuing process when required by an EU Directive. Approximation is a key word generally employed within the title of a directive, for example the Trade Marks Directive of 16 December 2015 serves "to approximate the laws of the Member States relating to trade marks". The European Commission describes approximation of law as "a unique obligation of membership in the European Union".

See also 

 
 
 
 
 
 Double tilde (disambiguation)Various meanings of ~~ or ≈

References

External links 

 

 
Numerical analysis
Equivalence (mathematics)
Comparison (mathematical)